Hammed Adesope is a Nigerian footballer who plays for Buffle fc F.C. in Benin republic  Premier League 2020 caf champions league 2021

Personal life

Hammed's mother has played a huge role in his life as a football player and she was the one who encouraged him to become a footballer. It is his ambition to become one of the most successful players in the world.

Club career

Nigeria
Hammed began his professional footballing career in 2000 with Nigerian club, Balogun Owoseni FC. In 2002, he moved to Ila-Orangun FC with whom he played till 2005. He then moved to Nigeria National League club, Prime F.C. where he played till 2007. He then moved to Nigerian Premier League club, Kwara United F.C. in 2007 where he played till 2009.

Vietnam
He first moved out of Nigeria in 2009 to Vietnam, where he signed a long-term contract with TDCS Đồng Tháp F.C. He made his V.League 1 debut on 22 January 2011 in a 0-0 draw against Navibank Sài Gòn F.C. and scored his first goal on 10 April 2011 in a 2-2 draw against Khatoco Khánh Hòa F.C. He scored 2 goals in 24 appearances in the 2011 V-League. He made his first appearance of the 2012 V-League on 29 April 2012 in a 4-1 win over Vissai Ninh Bình F.C. He made 10 appearances in the 2012 V-League.

Back to Nigeria
In 2013, he moved back to Nigeria where he signed a short-term contract with Nigerian Premier League relegation threatened club,  Shooting Stars SC. The club eventually finished at the 20th position in the 2013 Nigeria Premier League and got relegated to Nigeria National League.

Back to Vietnam
After a short spell with Shooting Stars SC, he returned to Vietnam where he signed a six-month contract with Kienlongbank Kiên Giang F.C. He made his debut for the club on 3 March 2013 in a 2-0 loss against SHB Đà Nẵng F.C. He made 6 appearances in the 2013 V.League 1.

India
In 2014, he moved to India where he signed a short-term contract with 2012–13 I-League champions, Churchill Brothers S.C. He made his I-League debut on 21 September 2013 in a 1-0 loss in a derby match against fierce rivals Salgaocar F.C. He made 7 appearances in the 2013–14 I-League. He also helped his club win the 2013–14 Indian Federation Cup.

Oman
On 27 January 2015, he signed a six-month contract with Oman Professional League club, Al-Oruba SC.

References

External links
Hammed Adesope at Goal.com 

Hammed Adesope - EUROSPORT
Hammed Adesope - SOCCER PUNTER
Hammed Adesope - YouTube

Living people
Nigerian footballers
Nigerian expatriate footballers
Association football defenders
Osun United F.C. players
Kwara United F.C. players
Shooting Stars S.C. players
Churchill Brothers FC Goa players
Al-Orouba SC players
V.League 1 players
I-League players
Oman Professional League players
Expatriate footballers in Vietnam
Nigerian expatriate sportspeople in Vietnam
Expatriate footballers in India
Nigerian expatriate sportspeople in India
Expatriate footballers in Oman
Nigerian expatriate sportspeople in Oman
Year of birth missing (living people)
Sportspeople from Ibadan